Bayır is a town in Muğla Province, Turkey

Geography

Bayır is a town in the Menteşe District of Muğla Province. At  it is situated on Turkish state highway  which connects Muğla to İzmir . The population is of Bayır is 4005  as of 2011.

History

But in 1941 after an earthquake, it was relocated in the present place. In 1956 it was declared a seat of township.

Economy

Local trade center of Muğla is in Bayır and there are marble workshops in the town. There is also a livestock market in the town.

References

Populated places in Muğla Province
Mediterranean Region, Turkey
Towns in Turkey
Menteşe District